Mordellistena epidendrana is a beetle in the genus Mordellistena of the family Mordellidae. It was described in 1937 by Ray.

References

epidendrana
Beetles described in 1937